Holdypaws is the second album by the indie rock band Deerhoof. It was released in 1999 on Kill Rock Stars, and reissued on vinyl by the same label on November 22, 2019, to commemorate the 25th anniversary of Deerhoof. Jamie Stewart of Xiu Xiu, a band that has worked with Deerhoof's Greg Saunier, has praised this album, saying "I had never heard anything like it before. It completely blew my mind and changed the way I thought about what music could be." Henry Rollins has praised this album, in addition to the band's EP Green Cosmos, saying "it gets the blood going. What a band."

Track listing

All songs written by Deerhoof.
"Magic Star"
"Queen of the Lake"
"The Moose's Daughter"
"Satan"
"Crow"
"Flower"
"Lady People"
"The Great Car Tomb"
"Dead Beast Queen"
"Data"

Personnel

 Rob Fisk – guitar
 Satomi Matsuzaki – bass guitar and vocals
 Greg Saunier – drums and vocals
 Kelly Goode - keyboard

References 

Deerhoof albums
1999 albums
Kill Rock Stars albums